Heat is the debut album by American metalcore band American Me. It was released on February 19, 2008 through Rise Records.

Track listing

Personnel

American Me
 Tony Tataje - vocals
 Brian Blade - guitars, bass guitar
 Scott Walker - drums

Production
Kris Crummett - production, mixing, mastering

References

2008 albums
American Me (band) albums
Rise Records albums